Ronan (Salish: ocqʔetkʷ) is a city in Lake County, Montana, United States. It lies on the Flathead Indian Reservation, approximately 12 miles south of Flathead Lake in the northwestern part of the state. The population was 1,955 at the 2020 census.

History
Originally called Spring Creek, Ronan's name was changed in 1893 in honor of Major Peter Ronan, superintendent of the Flathead Indian Reservation.

Geography
Ronan is located at  (47.528, −114.100). Ninepipe National Wildlife Refuge is about 5 miles to the south.

Climate
This climatic region is typified by large seasonal temperature differences, with warm to hot (and often Arid) summers and cold (sometimes severely cold) winters.  According to the Köppen Climate Classification system, Ronan has a humid continental climate, abbreviated "DFB" on climate maps.

Demographics

2010 census
As of the census of 2010, there were 1,871 people, 737 households, and 444 families living in the city. The racial makeup of the city was 61.3% White, 0.4% African American, 27.0% Native American, 0.5% Asian, 0.1% Pacific Islander, 0.6% from other races, and 10.1% from two or more races. Hispanic or Latino of any race were 4.7% of the population.

There were 737 households, of which 33.8% had children under the age of 18 living with them, 35.8% were married couples living together, 19.5% had a female householder with no husband present, 4.9% had a male householder with no wife present, and 39.8% were non-families. 33.2% of all households were made up of individuals, and 13.6% had someone living alone who was 65 years of age or older. The average household size was 2.41 and the average family size was 3.09.

The median age in the city was 34.7 years. 27.7% of residents were under the age of 18; 9.1% were between the ages of 18 and 24; 23.2% were from 25 to 44; 24.1% were from 45 to 64; and 16% were 65 years of age or older. The gender makeup of the city was 46.9% male and 53.1% female.

2000 census
As of the census of 2000, there were 1,812 people, 699 households, and 420 families living in the city. The population density was 1,701.5 people per square mile (660.0/km). There were 755 housing units at an average density of 709.0 per square mile (275.0/km). The racial makeup of the city was 62.42% White, 0.11% African American, 33.06% Native American, 0.11% Asian, 0.06% Pacific Islander, 0.44% from other races, and 3.81% from two or more races. Hispanic or Latino of any race were 3.37% of the population.

There were 699 households, out of which 34.3% had children under the age of 18 living with them, 38.6% were married couples living together, 15.6% had a female householder with no husband present, and 39.9% were non-families. 33.8% of all households were made up of individuals, and 15.7% had someone living alone who was 65 years of age or older. The average household size was 2.47 and the average family size was 3.18.

In the city, the population was spread out, with 29.2% under the age of 18, 9.8% from 18 to 24, 23.5% from 25 to 44, 20.8% from 45 to 64, and 16.8% who were 65 years of age or older. The median age was 35 years. For every 100 females there were 84.0 males. For every 100 females age 18 and over, there were 75.5 males.

The median income for a household in the city was $22,422, and the median income for a family was $29,750. Males had a median income of $27,847 versus $17,454 for females. The per capita income for the city was $11,678. About 20.0% of families and 24.8% of the population were below the poverty line, including 26.7% of those under age 18 and 21.8% of those age 65 or over.

Education
Public education in Ronan is provided by Ronan School District#30, which has four schools, three of them in Ronan:
Ronan High School
Ronan Middle School 
K. William Harvey Elementary School

Ronan City Library is the public library.

Transportation
The main highway route to Ronan is US 93. The closest Interstate is I-90, which is 46 miles to the south on US 93.  Nearby airports are in Kalispell and Missoula. The daily Amtrak passenger service the Empire Builder runs between Seattle/Portland and Chicago. Nearby depots are in Whitefish (76 miles north) and West Glacier.

Ronan Airport is a public use airport located 3 miles north of town.

Notable people
 Marvin Camel, professional boxer
 Corwin Clairmont, artist, activist and educator
 Rick Jore, member of the Montana House of Representatives; born and resides in Ronan
 Daniel Salomon, member of the Montana House of Representatives; born and resides in Ronan
 Laverne Parrish, WWII Medal of Honor recipient

References

External links
 
 Ronan Area Chamber of Commerce

Cities in Lake County, Montana
Cities in Montana